Beardslee is a surname. Notable people with the surname include:

Bethany Beardslee (born 1925), American soprano noted for her performances of contemporary classical music
Donald Beardslee (1943–2005), United States murderer executed by means of a lethal injection in San Quentin State Prison, California
Henry Curtis Beardslee Sr. (1807–1884), American physician, botanist and state legislator, with the botanical author abbreviation H.C.Beardslee
Henry Curtis Beardslee (1865–1948), American botanist and mycologist, with the botanical author abbreviation Beardslee
Lester A. Beardslee (1836–1903), United States Navy officer who served as the commander of the Department of Alaska from 1879 to 1880
Robert Beardslee (1868–1926), Republican city attorney of Stockton, California and state legislator
William A. Beardslee (1916–2001), professional theologian who made major contributions to the New Revised Standard Version of the Bible

See also
Beardslee Castle, castle in Little Falls, New York, USA, constructed in 1860 as a replica of an Irish castle
Beardslee Telegraph, portable military telegraph developed by George Beardslee and adopted by Alfred Myer
Beardslee trout, local form of Rainbow trout endemic to Lake Crescent in Washington
Beardsley (surname)